The Italy national under-16 and under-17 basketball team is the national representative for Italy in international under-16 and under-17 basketball tournaments. They are administered by the Federazione Italiana Pallacanestro. 

The team competes at the FIBA U16 European Championship, with the opportunity to qualify for the FIBA Under-17 World Cup.

Competitive record

FIBA U16 European Championship

FIBA Under-17 World Cup

See also
Italy national basketball team
Italy national under-20 basketball team
Italy national under-19 basketball team

References

External links
Official website 
FIBA profile

Men's national under-16 basketball teams
Men's national under-17 basketball teams
Basketball